Ryūichi, Ryuichi or Ryuuichi (written: 隆一, 龍一 or 竜一) is a masculine Japanese given name. Notable people with the name include:

, Japanese academic
, Japanese photographer
, Japanese footballer
, Japanese politician
, Japanese footballer
, Japanese film director and editor
, Japanese voice actor
, Japanese journalist
, Japanese baseball player
, Japanese footballer
, Japanese singer-songwriter, actor and record producer
, Japanese figure skater
, Japanese voice actor
, Japanese motorcycle racer
, Japanese bobsledder
, Japanese comedian
, Japanese samurai
, Japanese archer
, Japanese judoka and mixed martial artist
, Japanese figure skater
, Japanese golfer
, Japanese singer and musician
, Japanese musician and composer
, Japanese footballer and manager
, Japanese poet, writer and translator
, Japanese politician

Fictional characters
Ryuichi Sakuma, (佐久間竜一, Sakuma Ryūichi in Japanese) is the lead singer of a band called Nittle Grasper in the shōnen-ai manga and Anime series Gravitation.

Japanese masculine given names